Tom Towns (March 17, 1953) was a star linebacker for the Edmonton Eskimos of the Canadian Football League.

Towns played his university football with the University of Alberta Golden Bears. In 1972 he was on the starting lineup in the Vanier Cup Championship team. In 1973 he played on offense and defense for the Golden Bears, and was named as a Canada West All Star in 1973 and 1974. He was also selected to the All Canadian CIAU Team.

He began a ten-year career with the Eskimos on 1975. During this time, he was paired with Danny Kepley and Dale Potter for eight years, forming a linebacking unit that would lead Edmonton to 7 Grey Cups and 6 Grey Cup victories. Towns was an all star in 1980. He would finish his career in 1985, after being traded to the Ottawa Rough Riders.

References

1953 births
Living people
Alberta Golden Bears football players
Canadian football linebackers
Edmonton Elks players
Ottawa Rough Riders players
People from Rosetown
Players of Canadian football from Saskatchewan